Jeanne Olivier Bourguignon, stage name Mademoiselle Beauval (1648 – 1720), was a French stage actress.

She was engaged at the Molière's company in 1670. She became a Sociétaires of the Comédie-Française in 1680. She left in 1704 and became a famous soubrette.

References

External links
   Mademoiselle Beauval, Comédie-Française

1648 births
1720 deaths
17th-century French actresses
French stage actresses